The 2018–19 UEFA Nations League A was the top division of the 2018–19 edition of the UEFA Nations League, the inaugural season of the international football competition involving the men's national teams of the 55 member associations of UEFA. League A culminated with the Nations League Finals in June 2019, which crowned Portugal as the inaugural champions of the UEFA Nations League.

Format
League A consisted of the top 12 ranked UEFA members, split into four groups of three. The winners of each group advanced to the UEFA Nations League Finals. The third-placed team of each group was initially to be relegated to the 2020–21 UEFA Nations League B, but remained in League A following UEFA's reformatting of the next edition's groups.

The Nations League Finals took place in June 2019 and was played in a knockout format, consisting of the semi-finals, third place play-off, and final. The semi-final pairings, along with the administrative home teams for the third place play-off and final, were determined by means of an open draw on 3 December 2018. Host country Portugal was selected among the four qualified teams on 3 December 2018 by the UEFA Executive Committee, with the winners of the final crowned as the inaugural champions of the UEFA Nations League.

The four group winners were drawn into groups of five teams for the UEFA Euro 2020 qualifying competition (in order to accommodate for the Nations League Finals). In addition, League A was allocated one of the four remaining UEFA Euro 2020 places. Four teams from League A which had not already qualified for the European Championship finals competed in the play-offs, which were played in October and November 2020. The play-off berths were first allocated to the group winners, and if any of the group winners had already qualified for the European Championship finals, then to the next best ranked team of the league, etc. If there were fewer than four teams in League A which had not already qualified for the European Championship finals, the play-off berths would be allocated to the next best ranked team of the following league, etc. The play-offs consisted of two "one-off" semi-finals (best-ranked team vs. fourth best-ranked team and second best-ranked team vs. third best-ranked team, played at home of higher-ranked teams) and one "one-off" final between the two semi-final winners (venue drawn in advance between semi-final 1 and 2).

Seeding
Teams were allocated to League A according to their UEFA national team coefficients after the conclusion of the 2018 FIFA World Cup qualifying group stage on 11 October 2017. Teams were split into three pots of four teams, ordered based on their UEFA national team coefficient. The seeding pots for the draw were announced on 7 December 2017.

The group draw took place at the SwissTech Convention Center in Lausanne, Switzerland on 24 January 2018, 12:00 CET.

Groups
The fixture list was confirmed by UEFA on 24 January 2018 following the draw.

Times are CET/CEST, as listed by UEFA (local times, if different, are in parentheses).

Group 1

Group 2

Group 3

Group 4

Nations League Finals

The host of the Nations League Finals, Portugal, was selected from the four qualified teams. The semi-finals pairings were determined by means of an open draw, along with the administrative home teams for the third place play-off and final. The draw took place on 3 December 2018, 14:30 CET (13:30 local time), at the Shelbourne Hotel in Dublin, Republic of Ireland. For scheduling purposes, the semi-final pairing involving the host team was considered to be semi-final 1.

Times are CEST (UTC+2), as listed by UEFA (local times are in parentheses).

Bracket

Semi-finals

Third-place play-off

Final

Goalscorers

Overall ranking
The 12 League A teams were ranked 1st to 12th overall in the 2018–19 UEFA Nations League according to the following rules:
The teams finishing first in the groups were ranked 1st to 4th according to the results of the Nations League Finals.
The teams finishing second in the groups were ranked 5th to 8th according to the results of the league phase.
The teams finishing third in the groups were ranked 9th to 12th according to the results of the league phase.

Prize money
The prize money to be distributed was announced in March 2018. Each team in League A received a solidarity fee of €1.5 million. In addition, the four group winners received double this amount via a €1.5M bonus fee.

The four group winners of League A, which participated in the Nations League Finals, also received the following fees based on performance:
 Winners: €4.5M
 Runners-up: €3.5M
 Third place: €2.5M
 Fourth place: €1.5M

This meant that the maximum amount of solidarity and bonus fees for a team from League A was €7.5M.

Euro 2020 qualifying play-offs

The four best teams in League A according to the overall ranking that did not qualify for UEFA Euro 2020 through the qualifying group stage were set to compete in the play-offs, with the winners qualifying for the final tournament. As Iceland were the only team in League A that did not qualify, the remaining three slots were allocated to teams identified according to the path formation rules to be the three best-ranked un-qualified non-group winners from League C not drawn to Path C.

Notes

References

External links

League A